SM UC-3 was a German Type UC I minelayer submarine or U-boat in the German Imperial Navy during World War I. The U-boat had been ordered by November 1914 and was launched on 28 May 1915. She was commissioned into the German Imperial Navy on 1 June 1915 as UC-3. Mines laid by UC-3 in her 29 patrols were credited with sinking 22 ships and damaging 2 others. UC-3 was caught in a net, detected by hydrophone, and sunk on 23 April 1916 or mined and sunk on 27 May 1916.

Design
A German Type UC I submarine, UC-3 had a displacement of  when at the surface and  while submerged. The submarine was powered by one Daimler-Motoren-Gesellschaft six-cylinder, four-stroke diesel engine producing , an electric motor producing , and one propeller shaft.

UC-3 was fitted with six  mine tubes, twelve UC 120 mines, and one  machine gun. She was built by AG Vulcan Stettin and her complement was fourteen crew members.

Fate

UC-3 was the first submarine to be detected and sunk using a hydrophone. UC-3s fate have different version: One is on 23 April 1916 she was detected using a hydrophone, trapped in a net, and then quickly sunk after a large explosion. The ship that sank her was the anti-submarine trawler Cheerio, captained by Thomson. Another is on 27 May 1916 , she got mined and sunk.

Summary of raiding history

Notes

References

Bibliography

German Type UC I submarines
U-boats commissioned in 1915
World War I submarines of Germany
Maritime incidents in 1916
U-boats sunk in 1916
U-boats sunk by mines
1915 ships
World War I minelayers of Germany
Ships built in Hamburg
World War I shipwrecks in the English Channel
Ships lost with all hands